Aldine is an unincorporated community in California Township, Starke County, in the U.S. state of Indiana.

History
A post office was established at Aldine in 1883, and remained in operation until it was discontinued in 1919.

Geography

References

Unincorporated communities in Starke County, Indiana
Unincorporated communities in Indiana